Agnes Marion McLean Walsh  (née Gibson; 10 June 1884 – 12 August 1967) was head matron of King Edward Memorial Hospital, a Western Australian maternity hospital from 1922 until her retirement in December 1954, during which time more than 60,000 babies were born under her supervision. In that capacity she advised the Commonwealth Government on midwifery policy and was on the National Medical Research Council.

In the 1949 New Year Honours Walsh was made an Officer of the British Empire (OBE) and received her award at Government House, Perth in July of the same year.

The Agnes Walsh Nurses’ Home was opened by the West Australian Minister for Health, Dame Florence Cardell-Oliver in January 1953.

References

1884 births
1967 deaths
Australian midwives
Officers of the Order of the British Empire
19th-century Australian women
20th-century Australian women